The Spanish River is a brackish distributary river that forms part of the border between Baldwin and Mobile counties in Alabama.

It contains two significant shipwrecks that date to the American Civil War period. The Confederate ironclads, CSS Tuscaloosa and CSS Huntsville, were both scuttled in the river on April 12, 1865, to prevent their capture following the surrender of the city of Mobile.

See also
List of Alabama rivers

References

Rivers of Mobile County, Alabama
Rivers of Baldwin County, Alabama
Rivers of Alabama
Tributaries of Mobile Bay